Kulun Lake is a rock-dammed lake in Kara-Kulja District, Osh Region of Kyrgyzstan. It is located at the altitude of 2856 m in catchment of the river Kulun, a right tributary of the river Tar.

References 

Lakes of Kyrgyzstan
Mountain lakes